Vladislav "Vlad" Lomko (born 27 December 2004) is a Russian racing driver who last competed in the Euroformula Open with CryptoTower Racing. He is the reigning Pau Grand Prix winner.

Career

Karting 
Lomko started driving karts in his native Russia, finishing third in the national championship in 2016, before moving to France at the age of 14 to race in European series. His biggest success on the international karting scene would be winning the Benelux Championship.

Formula 4

2019 
In 2019 the Russian made his debut in single-seaters, competing in the Budapest round of the French F4 Championship. He would later return to race in the final round at Le Castellet, achieving two top-ten finishes.

2020 
For the 2020 season, Lomko switched to the ADAC F4 Championship, partnering Elias Seppänen and fellow rookies Tim Tramnitz and Ollie Bearman at US Racing. The season started in disappointing fashion, as Lomko was the only one out of his teammates to not score a podium finish in the first third of the year. However, at the fourth round at the Nürburgring the Russian would take his first victory in car racing, scoring the fastest lap in addition to the win. Lomko added to that in the penultimate event at the Lausitzring, winning a chaotic and wet Race 1. He finished the season eighth in the standings, only eleven points behind teammate Bearman, but nonetheless, lowest of the US Racing drivers.

2021 

The following year Lomko made a one-off appearance in the F4 UAE Championship, winning two races of the finale at the Dubai Autodrome.

To partake in his main campaign, Lomko returned to US Racing to once again drive alongside Tramnitz in the German F4 series, but this time being joined by Luke Browning and, on occasions, Alex Dunne. He took a victory at the reversed-grid race at the Sachsenring, fending off former teammate Bearman in the final few laps. Lomko scored three further podiums, all being third places, and ended up sixth, being beaten significantly by both Tramnitz and Browning.

Euroformula Open 
In 2022, Lomko progressed to the Euroformula Open Championship, driving for CryptoTower Racing alongside Christian Mansell and series returnee Josh Mason. In his first race at the Estoril Circuit Lomko, racing under a French licence, finished second and took a rookie victory. The second race would be less successful after contact with Nicola Marinangeli, but he would recover to fifth in race 3. Lomko followed that up with a third place in Race 1 at Pau, having started second but being overtaken by teammate Mansell at the start. On Sunday he would change his fortunes however, winning the Pau Grand Prix and taking his first win in the series. A triple of podiums followed at Le Castellet,  after which the Russian managed to score two podiums in Belgium, having been forced to start from the back of the grid in all three races. He scored his first pole position in the category at the following event in Budapest, but would only end up scoring a sole second place across the weekend. Having stated during the summer break that he had the speed to fight with championship leader Oliver Goethe, Lomko took victory in Race 2 at Imola and followed that up with a triple of podiums in Spielberg, which included another race win. The penultimate round of the campaign would bring even more success for Lomko, as he converted pole position into victory in a rainy race on Saturday. The following day, two closely-fought fights for the race lead yielded a pair of podiums, with Lomko coming out victorious in Race 3. Despite this, a win and another second place during the season finale in Barcelona could not prevent Goethe from taking the title, as Lomko was forced to settle for second in the championship, whilst also winning the Rookies' Championship in dominating fashion.

Super Formula Lights 
At the end of 2022, Lomko partook in the Super Formula Lights post-season test at Suzuka, driving for championship-winning team TOM'S alongside Formula Regional Japanese Champion Miki Koyama.

Personal life 
His brother Lev is also a racing driver, who recently competed in karts in the KZ2 category.

Karting record

Karting career summary

Racing record

Racing career summary 
 
* Season still in progress.† As Lomko was a guest driver, he was ineligible to score points.

Complete Italian F4 Championship results 
(key) (Races in bold indicate pole position) (Races in italics indicate fastest lap)

Complete ADAC Formula 4 Championship results 
(key) (Races in bold indicate pole position) (Races in italics indicate fastest lap)

Complete Euroformula Open Championship results 
(key) (Races in bold indicate pole position) (Races in italics indicate fastest lap)

Complete Asian Le Mans Series results 
(key) (Races in bold indicate pole position) (Races in italics indicate fastest lap)

Complete European Le Mans Series results
(key) (Races in bold indicate pole position; results in italics indicate fastest lap)

References

External links 

 

2004 births
Living people
Russian racing drivers
Italian F4 Championship drivers
ADAC Formula 4 drivers
French F4 Championship drivers
Euroformula Open Championship drivers
Formula Regional Asian Championship drivers
US Racing drivers
Mücke Motorsport drivers
Motopark Academy drivers
Hitech Grand Prix drivers
Karting World Championship drivers
Russian expatriate sportspeople in France
UAE F4 Championship drivers
Asian Le Mans Series drivers
European Le Mans Series drivers